The Bihar State Road Development Corporation Limited, (abbreviated BSRDC), is an Indian Public limited company fully owned by Government of Bihar. BSRDC was established on April 20, 2009, and incorporated as a public limited company under the Companies Act 1956 on February 17, 2009. This company was established to promote surface infrastructure by taking up Road Works, Bridges etc., and to improve road network by taking up construction widening and strengthening of roads, construction of bridges, maintenance of roads etc. in state of Bihar.

The roles and responsibilities of the BSRDC are listed as:
"To construct, execute, carryout, improve, work, develop, administer, manage, control or maintain in Bihar and elsewhere all types of roads, highways, express routes, paths, streets, bridges, sideways, tunnels and other infrastructure, works and conveniences, approach road, sheds, temporary dwelling huts in case of calamity or any emergency pertaining to all departments of Government of Bihar or any other department, agency, organization or body through Road Construction Department or directly. It also oversees the maintenance of Roads in Bihar."

Departments
The BSRDC has following departments:
 Administration
 Engineering
 Toll Monitoring
 Lands
 Accounts/Finance
 Commercial

References

External links

State agencies of Bihar
Roads in Bihar
Road authorities
Transport organisations based in India
2009 establishments in Bihar
Government agencies established in 2009
Transport companies established in 2009